Harvey Peterson is an American former Negro league outfielder who played in the 1930s.

Peterson made his Negro leagues debut in 1931 with the Montgomery Grey Sox, Knoxville Giants, and Birmingham Black Barons. He went on to play for several teams, finishing his career in 1936 with the Cincinnati Tigers.

References

External links
 and Baseball-Reference Black Baseball stats and Seamheads

Year of birth missing
Place of birth missing
Birmingham Black Barons players
Cincinnati Tigers (baseball) players
Cleveland Cubs players
Memphis Red Sox players
Montgomery Grey Sox players
Baseball outfielders